Rokanuddaula Mandal Politician of Kurigram district of Bangladesh and Former Member of Parliament for Kurigram-4 constituency in 1988 by-election.

Career 
Mandal is a politician of Jatiya Party. He is the cousin of former President Hussein Muhammad Ershad. When Najimuddaula, an MP from Kurigram-4 constituency, died in 1988, he was elected as a Member of Parliament as a candidate of Jatiya Party in the by-elections.

References 

Living people
Year of birth missing (living people)
People from Kurigram District
Jatiya Party politicians
4th Jatiya Sangsad members